The 1919–20 season was Galatasaray SK's 16th in existence. The Istanbul Football League was aborted. Galatasaray SK played only friendly matches.

Friendly Matches
Kick-off listed in local time (EEST)

Türkiye Makriköy Gençlerbirliği Turnuvası
Kick-off listed in local time (EEST)

References
 Futbol vol.2, Galatasaray. Tercüman Spor Ansiklopedisi.(1981) (page 557, 512)
 Atabeyoğlu, Cem. 1453-1991 Türk Spor Tarihi Ansiklopedisi. page(75, 77).(1991) An Grafik Basın Sanayi ve Ticaret AŞ
 1919-1920 İstanbul Futbol Ligi. Türk Futbol Tarihi vol.1. page(42). (June 1992) Türkiye Futbol Federasyonu Yayınları.

External links
 Galatasaray Sports Club Official Website 
 Turkish Football Federation - Galatasaray A.Ş. 
 uefa.com - Galatasaray AŞ

Galatasaray S.K. (football) seasons
Turkish football clubs 1919–20 season
1910s in Istanbul
1920s in Istanbul